laSexta 3 was a Spanish television channel, owned and operated by Atresmedia. It was founded and started to broadcast on 2010. La Sexta 3 currently broadcasts in Spanish. Since 2012 it only broadcast cinema.

History
The channel ceased broadcasting on 5 May 2014, as a consequence of a sentence by the Supreme Court that annulled the concessions for nine channels broadcasting in DTT, because their permissions for frequencies were granted without the required public consensus and assignments system according to the Audiovisual Law.

References

External links
Official website

Defunct television channels in Spain
Television channels and stations established in 2010
Television channels and stations disestablished in 2014
2010 establishments in Spain
2014 disestablishments in Spain
Atresmedia channels